The New York Evening Telegram was a New York City daily newspaper. It was established in 1867. The newspaper was published by James Gordon Bennett, Jr., and it was said to be considered to be an evening edition of the New York Herald.

Frank Munsey acquired the Telegram in 1920, which ceased its connection to the Herald. It merged into the New York Evening Mail in 1924. Eventually, it was merged into the New York World-Telegram.

References

External links

 Index of several issues of New York Evening Telegram
 Library of Congress' cataloging record

Defunct newspapers published in New York City
Newspapers established in 1867
Publications disestablished in 1924
1867 establishments in New York (state)
1924 disestablishments in New York (state)
Daily newspapers published in New York City